H&H, H and H or HH may refer to:

Companies
 H&H Bagels, a New York City bagel store
 H&H Classics, automobile auctioneers
 H&H Restaurant, a Macon, Georgia restaurant 
 H&H Shooting Sports, an Oklahoma City shooting range
 Holland & Holland, gun maker
 Howe & Howe Technologies, vehicle fabrication

Other
 The popular name of Boston's Handel and Haydn Society 
 Hemoglobin and hematocrit, as a combination blood test
 .240 Holland & Holland Magnum, a centrefire rifle cartridge